Joseph Oyanga (28 February 1936 – 21 July 2018), was a Ugandan Roman Catholic priest who served as the Bishop of the Roman Catholic Diocese of Lira from 4 July 1989 until 2 December 2003.

Background and priesthood
He was born in Omararii Village, Omoro sub-county in present-day Alebtong District, in Lango sub-region, in the Northern Region of Uganda. Oyanga was ordained to the priesthood in Lira, on 15 May 1963. He served as priest in Lira Diocese until 4 July 1989.

As bishop
He was appointed Bishop of Lira Diocese on 4 July 1989. Oyanga was consecrated bishop on 1 October 1989 at Lira by Cardinal Emmanuel Kiwanuka Nsubuga†, Archbishop of Roman Catholic Archdiocese of Kampala assisted by Bishop James Odongo, Bishop of the Diocese of the Uganda Military and Bishop Erasmus Desiderius Wandera, Bishop of Soroti.

Joseph Oyanga died as Bishop Emeritus, Diocese of Lira, on 21 July 2018 at St. Anthony's Hospital, in the town of Tororo, in the Roman Catholic Archdiocese of Tororo.

See also
 Uganda Martyrs
 Roman Catholicism in Uganda

Succession table

References

External links
Profile of the Roman Catholic Diocese of Lira

1936 births
2018 deaths
People from Alebtong District
20th-century Roman Catholic bishops in Uganda
21st-century Roman Catholic bishops in Uganda
Roman Catholic bishops of Lira